King Flux was a band started by Richie Stotts after the breakup of the Plasmatics in 1985. King Flux's first incarnation consisted of Richie on guitar, Billy and Andy Hilfiger (younger brothers of fashion designer Tommy Hilfiger), and Marky Ramone on drums. Apparently, they also played under the name Hill-Fire. Other people played with the band throughout its short existence including Chris "Junior" Romanelli on bass guitar, Christopher Bell (currently with The Freddie Long Band) on guitar, and Tony Petri (from Twisted Sister) and Albert Bouchard of Blue Öyster Cult on drums. Also, Zippy McAdam, from NYC, played bass with King Flux, appearing on the Uncle Floyd show,.

Discography
The Man with the X-Ray Eyes/1944 - This was the only vinyl release by King Flux, a 7" single. The B-Side consisted of the song "1944". The lineup on the single was Richie Stotts on guitar and vocals, Chris "Junior" Romanelli on bass guitar and Albert Bouchard on drums. Richie produced the single. It was released by the American Gothic Record Company and distributed by Dutch East India. Tommy Lafferty was one of the original guitarists.

American rock music groups